Maegan Manasse and Jessica Pegula were the defending champions, but chose not to participate.

Ellen Perez and Luisa Stefani won the title, defeating Sharon Fichman and Ena Shibahara in the final, 1–6, 6–4, [10–5].

Seeds

Draw

Draw

References

External Links
Main Draw

Oracle Challenger Series – Houston - Doubles